Boeromedusidae is a family of cnidarians belonging to the order Anthoathecata. It contains a single genus, Boeromedusa.

References

Aplanulata
Hydrozoan genera